The following lists events that happened during 1853 in Chile.

Incumbents
President of Chile: Manuel Montt

Events 
date unknown - The first Chilean postage stamps are issued.

Births
25 September - Juan Francisco González (died 1933)

Deaths
December - Nicolás Rodríguez Peña (born 1775)

References 

 
1850s in Chile
Chile
Chile